"Sweet Sorrow" is an episode of the BBC sitcom, The Green Green Grass. It was first screened on 30 November 2007, as the fourth episode of series three.

Synopsis

Boycie and Marlene are flushed with pride as they dream of their son's golden future, but when Tyler's exam results let him down, it is the staff who provide the key to his career and get him motivated. Meanwhile, Boycie calls in a favour that will help Tyler get into university.

Episode cast

References

External links
British TV Comedy Guide for The Green Green Grass, phill.co.uk
BARB viewing figures, barb.com

2007 British television episodes
The Green Green Grass episodes